"Able to Love" is the second single by Italian DJ and producer Benny Benassi, from his album Hypnotica. It was released in June 2003 in order to promote the album's debut in August. At the time, the producing of the song took more than 6 months, as with "Satisfaction". The song remixes the main beat of "Satisfaction" and features vocals from Paul French and Violeta (a.k.a. The Biz).

Charts

References

2003 singles
2003 songs
Benny Benassi songs
Songs written by Benny Benassi
Songs written by Alle Benassi